Metropolitan Area Express (MAX) is a light rail transit system serving the Portland metropolitan area, Oregon, United States. The system is operated by TriMet, a public agency that operates public transit in the Portland area. Serving an average of 130,000 passengers a day (in Fiscal Year 2012), MAX Light Rail is one of the largest light rail systems in the United States in terms of ridership.

The MAX system currently consists of five lines, each designated by a color.
: Hillsboro – City Center – Gresham
: Clackamas – City Center – Portland State University
: Union Station – City Center – Portland State University – Milwaukie
: Portland International Airport – City Center – Beaverton
: Expo Center – City Center – Portland State University

MAX Light Rail began service on September 5, 1986 with the opening of the original segment from Downtown Portland to Gresham. An extension westward to Beaverton and Hillsboro opened in 1998. The resulting 33-mile east-west line has always been operated as a single through route, and it became known as the Blue Line in 2001, after TriMet adopted color designations for its separate light rail routes after the Red Line opened to the airport. The Yellow Line branch to the Expo Center opened in 2004. In 2009, the Green Line opened, serving the Portland Transit Mall (along with the rerouted Yellow Line) and the new I-205 branch to Clackamas.

The system currently has a total of 97 stations, with 3 scheduled to close in March 2020. Fifty-one stations are served by the Blue Line, 28 stations by the Green Line, 17 by the Orange Line, 29 by the Red Line, and 17 by the Yellow Line, with 39 stations served by two or more lines and 8 by three. All trains connect at Pioneer Courthouse Square.

Since 2012, there is a flat fare for the entire TriMet system.  Prior to 2012, fares on the MAX system were zonal (i.e. distance-based), the same as on TriMet's bus service.  The center of downtown was called Fareless Square (later the "Free Rail Zone") and included the area from the Library and Galleria stations to the Old Town/Chinatown Station. This was later expanded across the Steel Bridge into the Lloyd District as far as the Lloyd Center/NE 11th Ave station, and the Interstate/Rose Quarter station.  When the Portland Transit Mall was remodeled in 2009 to accommodate light rail, all stations on the transit mall were included as part of Fareless Square.  Moving out from the center of downtown, Zone 1 included the Albina/Mississippi station on the Yellow Line, and from Providence Park to Washington Park on the Red and Blue lines.  Zone 2 consisted of the rest of the Yellow Line (from Overlook Park to the Expo Center) as well as the three stations next to Interstate 84 (Hollywood/NE 42nd, NE 60th, and NE 82nd).  Zone 3 consisted of all other MAX stations, including all stations in Washington County and all stations beyond the Gateway/NE 99th Avenue Transit Center.

Stations

(Transit connections in italics are not part of the TriMet system)

References
Specific

General

External links

List of MAX Light Rail stations on TriMet website

Max